GON-4-like protein is a protein that in humans is encoded by the GON4L gene. It is a nuclear protein containing two serine phosphosites and a lysine-glutamine cross-link  and is thought to be a transcription factor.

References

Further reading